Zephyr was a sternwheel steamboat of the Puget Sound Mosquito Fleet.

Career
Zephyr was built in 1871 for the famous steamboat captain Tom Wright.  In 1872, the Merchants Transportation Company of Olympia was formed, with  Zephyr becoming the company's first steamboat.  The vessel was placed on the Olympia, Washington-Steilacoom-Tacoma-Seattle run, making way-stops en route, and competing with another sternwheeler, Messenger, and making the run on alternating days.  In 1907, the vessel was sold for scrapping in Seattle.

References

 Findlay, Jean Cammon and Paterson, Robin, Mosquito Fleet of Southern Puget Sound, (2008) Arcadia Publishing 

1871 ships
Steamboats of Washington (state)
Passenger ships of the United States
Sternwheelers of Washington (state)